Acke Åslund (27 October 1881 – 13 February 1958) was a Swedish painter and printmaker. His work was part of the painting event in the art competition at the 1932 Summer Olympics.

Åslund is represented in the collections of the Moderna Museet ("the Museum of Modern Art") in Stockholm, the Jamtli, the Västergötland Museum ("Västergötlands museum") and the Nordic Museum ("Nordiska Museet") in Stockholm.

References

Further sources
 Svenskt konstnärslexikon del V, pp. 788–789, Allhems Förlag, Malmö
 Daregård, Lisbeth (1981): Acke Åslund – hästmålaren. Konstvetenskapliga institutionen, Stockholms universitet
 Daregård, Lisbeth (1981): "Acke Åslund" in Jämten (Östersund: Jamtli 1906-) 1982 (75): pp.142–163. ISSN 0348-9825
 Dyrendahl, Sven (1983): "Acke Åslund: djurkonstnären, bohemen, veterinärvännen" in Svensk veterinärhistorisk och biografisk forskning: vol 2. (Sveriges veterinärförbund): pp. 463–477. ISSN 0346-2250

1881 births
1958 deaths
20th-century Swedish painters
Swedish male painters
Olympic competitors in art competitions
People from Östersund
20th-century Swedish male artists